"One Woman" is a song by American girl group Jade, released in 1993 as the third single from their debut album, Jade to the Max (1992). The song peaked at number 22 on the US Billboard Hot 100.

Critical reception
Alan Jones from Music Week gave the song three out of five, writing, "Tonya, Joi and Di wrap their tonsils round a styllsh and sophisticated soul ballad that is already getting heavy play from specialist radio and has great crossover potential. The addition of radically different mixes of their hit "Don't Walk Away" should give it added impetus."

Charts

Release history

References

1992 songs
1993 singles
Giant Records (Warner) singles
Jade (American group) songs
Songs written by Ronald Spearman
Songs written by Vassal Benford